Murong Yi (died 386) was a ruler of the Xianbei-led Chinese Western Yan dynasty. He was a son of the Former Yan Prince of Yidu, Murong Huan (慕容桓), a son of the founder of Former Yan, Murong Huang.

In 386, after the temporary ruler Duan Sui was ambushed and killed by Murong Heng (慕容恆) and Murong Yong, they supported Murong Yi as the Prince of Yan.  The Western Yan people—400,000 men and women—then abandoned Chang'an, which had been the Former Qin capital but had been captured by the prior Western Yan ruler Murong Chong -- to head back to their homeland in the east.  While on the journey, however, Murong Heng's brother Murong Tao (慕容韜) killed Murong Yi at Linjin (臨晉, in modern Weinan, Shaanxi).  He was replaced by Murong Chong's son Murong Yao.

Western Yan monarchs
386 deaths
Year of birth unknown